Pankaj Singh Pundir (born 17 May 1976), popularly known as Sher Singh Rana or S. Rana, is an Indian criminal turned politician who was sentenced for the 2001 vendetta-related assassination of Indian dacoit-turned-parliamentarian, Phoolan Devi. In August 2014, Rana was sentenced to life imprisonment and a fine of ₹100,000 (approximately US$1,600) for Devi's assassination, as well as charges of conspiracy, after a 10-year trial.

Early life 
Sher Singh Rana was born as Pankaj Singh Pundir in Roorkee, Uttarakhand, India on 17 May 1976.

Phoolan Devi assassination
Rana, along with two other men, murdered Phoolan Devi outside her home in New Delhi in July 2001. At the time of her assassination, ex-dacoit and anarchist Phoolan Devi was a sitting Member of Parliament in the 13th Lok Sabha. Rana claims he was motivated to take revenge upon her for her actions as a leader of a bandit gang that acted primarily against the higher castes in the late 1970s and early 1980s. Rana was arrested and confessed to the murder.

Escape from Tihar jail
Rana rescaped from Tihar jail, a high-security prison facility in Delhi, on 17 February 2004 with the help of his friend Sandeep, who in the guise of a policeman pretended to take Rana to a Haridwar court. He went to Moradabad and checked into a hotel. He then contacted relatives who sent him ₹1 lakh through Sandeep. From Ranchi he applied for a passport in the name of Sanjay Gupta.

During the two-month wait for the passport, he visited Gaya and Benaras, where he met his "financer" Subhash Thakur, who was then lodged in a local jail. Rana then went to Kolkata, where he obtained a three-month Bangladesh visa. Rana claimed that he took a house for rent at Khulna and lived there, posing as Sanjay. After he fled to Bangladesh, he bought a satellite phone for ₹16,500 so that he could contact his relatives and friends without being tracked. Throughout his journey — from Moradabad to Ranchi, Kolkata, Bangladesh and Dubai to Afghanistan, - he kept getting about ₹15,000 to ₹20,000 per month as personal expense allegedly from the accomplices of an Uttar Pradesh-based criminal Subhash Thakur. He visited Kolkata often to get his visa extended. At times, he did this in Dhaka.

Abscondence and controversies
Later, he illegally travelled from Dhaka to Dubai. He was later glorified by the Hindu Kshatriya Sena.

Claims of bringing back remains of Prithviraj Chauhan 
In his statement given to police during his arrest, he claimed to have brought the remains of 11th century Hindu Rajput ruler Prithviraj Chauhan from Kandahar. Rana made claims to have built memorial of the king in Etawah, Uttar Pradesh too, but Kanpur police found the claims to be false and only a foundation stone for a temple existed there.

Re-arrest 
On 2006-04-25 he was re-arrested from Kolkata by SIT as a suspect buying Hindi newspaper.

Release
A trial court in January 2012 allowed Sher Singh Rana, to file his nomination papers from Tihar to contest Uttar Pradesh assembly election. The Delhi High Court has granted bail to Sher Singh Rana and he was released on 24 October 2016.

Afterwards 
He married with Pratima Singh on 28 February 2018, who is the daughter of former Member of Legislative Assembly from Madhya Pradesh, Rana Pratap Singh in Chhatarpur district of Madhya Pradesh by taking a shagun of Rs. 51. In the year 2019, he formed his own political party, Rashtravadi Janlok Party (RJP).

References

External links
 The Phoolan Devi Murder

1976 births
Living people
Indian prisoners and detainees
Criminals from Uttar Pradesh
Inmates of Tihar Jail
Indian Hindus
Crime in Delhi
Hindu nationalists